Kannapolis station is an Amtrak train station in Kannapolis, North Carolina, United States. It is located at 201 South Main Street, within walking distance of Atrium Health Ballpark and the North Carolina Research Campus, in downtown Kannapolis.

History
This facility was completed in December 2004 to serve as a permanent replacement for the temporary facility that was across the parking lot from where the current facility rests. The station blends with the existing architecture of downtown Kannapolis, with Gomes & Staub serving as architect and Titus Construction serving as general contractor.

Services
The station, operated by Amtrak, is served by eight trains per day. 
The , is both the first train, towards New York, and the last train, towards Charlotte.
The , a regional companion of the Carolinian that runs three round-trips between Raleigh and Charlotte.

The facility is open daily at 6:30am-1:00pm and at 3:00pm-8:30pm; it includes Quik-Trak kiosks, waiting area and restrooms. No baggage service is available at this station.

References

External links 

Kannapolis Station – NC By Train
Old & New Kannapolis Amtrak Stations (USA Rail Guide -- Train Web)

Amtrak station
Amtrak stations in North Carolina
Railway stations in the United States opened in 2004
Buildings and structures in Cabarrus County, North Carolina
Transportation in Cabarrus County, North Carolina